Eleven Pairs of Boots (Spanish: Once pares de botas) is a 1954 Spanish comedy sports film directed by Francisco Rovira Beleta and starring José Suárez, Mari Carmen Pardo and Elisa Montés.

Plot 
Laura, the daughter of the director of Club Deportivo Hispania, manages to sign the promising player Ariza, who comes from the little town of Valmoral de la Sierra. The spark arises between them but Laura has another suitor, the player Mario Valero.

Valero, full of jealousy, allows himself to be bribed to make his team lose. Ariza discovers his plans and can think of no better solution to avoid defeat than to injure Valero.

Ariza is left as a savage, everyone turns their back on him and he has to leave the team, but finally the truth is discovered and he is rehabilitated.

Cast
 José Suárez as Ignacio Ariza  
  Mari Carmen Pardo as Laura López Salgado
 Elisa Montés as Esther  
 José Isbert as Padre Roque  
 Manolo Morán as Ernesto  
 Mary Santpere as Camarera  
  Javier Armet as Mario Valero  
 Jesús Colomer
 Josep Maria Angelat as Enrique 
 Francisco Javier Marcet as himself  
 Antonio Ramallets as Deusto  
 Mariano Martín 
 Aldecoa as Aldecoa, soccer player 
 José Samitier as Secretario técnico  
 Fernando Vallejo as López Salgado  
 Félix de Pomés as Quijano 
 Enrique Aycart as Presidente del Hispania 
 María Victoria Durá as Ana  
 Carlos Ronda 
 Ramón Vaccaro as Julián Ruiz  
 José Ramón Giner as Hombrecillo 
 Salvador Muñoz
 Mariano Pombo 
 Luis Parellada 
 Eduardo Berraondo
 Jorge Morales 
 Juan Monfort
 Enrique Martí 
 Enrique Tusquets 
 Matías Prats as Announcer  
 Miguel Ángel Valdivieso as Announcer
 Federico Gallo as Announcer  
 Manuel Cano as Announcer 
 Gabriel Alonso as soccer player  
 Gustavo Biosca as Soccer player  
 Campanal as soccer player  
 Alfredo Di Stéfano as soccer player  
 Fernández as soccer player  
 Agustín Gainza as soccer player  
 Ipiña as soccer player  
 Enrique Lesmes as soccer player  
 Miguel as soccer player 
 Luis Molowny as soccer player  
 Miguel Muñoz as soccer player  
  Navarro as soccer player 
 Roque Olsen as soccer player
 Pasieguito as soccer player  
 Puchades as soccer player  
 Jacinto Quincoces as soccer player 
 José Segarra as soccer player  
 Teruel as soccer player  
 Venancio as soccer player  
 Zarra as soccer player  
 Núria Espert 
 Emilio Fábregas as López Salgado (voice)  
 Rosa Guiñón as Esther (voice)  
 Juan Ibáñez as Secretario técnico (voice)  
 Carmen Lombarte as Laura López Salgado (voice)  
 Tete Montoliu as himself  
 César Ojinaga
 Felip Peña as Aldecoa (voice) 
 Alfonso Santigosa as Deusto (voice)
 Juan Manuel Soriano as Lasky (voice)

References

Bibliography 
 Bentley, Bernard. A Companion to Spanish Cinema. Boydell & Brewer 2008.

External links 
 

1950s sports comedy films
Spanish association football films
1954 films
1950s Spanish-language films
Films directed by Francisco Rovira Beleta
Spanish sports comedy films
Spanish black-and-white films
1950s Spanish films